Amephana is a genus of moths of the family Noctuidae.

Species
 Subgenus Amephana
 Amephana anarrhini (Duponchel, 1840)
 Subgenus Trigonephra Berio, 1980
 Amephana aurita (Fabricius, 1787)
 Amephana dalmatica (Rebel, 1919)

References
 Amephana at Markku Savela's Lepidoptera and some other life forms
 Natural History Museum Lepidoptera genus database

Cuculliinae
Noctuoidea genera